Mark Anthony Awuni is a Ghanaian politician of the Republic of Ghana. He was the Member of Parliament representing Binduri constituency of the Upper East Region of Ghana in the 4th Parliament of the 4th Republic of Ghana. He is a member of the National Democratic Congress.

Early life and education 
Awuni was born on March 12, 1950. He is a product of Claver House Institute. He holds a Diploma in Education from the institute.

Career 
Awuni is a teacher by profession.

Political career 
Awuni is a member of the National Democratic Congress. He became a member of parliament from January 2005 after emerging winner in the General Election in December 2004. He was elected as the member of parliament for the Binduri constituency in the fourth parliament of the fourth Republic of Ghana.

Elections 
Awuni was elected as the member of parliament for the Binduri constituency of the Upper East Region of Ghana for the first time in the 2004 Ghanaian general elections.  He won on the ticket of the National Democratic Congress. His constituency was a part of the 9 parliamentary seats out of 13 seats won by the National Democratic Congress in that election for the Upper East Region.  The National Democratic Congress won a minority total of 94 parliamentary seats out of 230 seats.  He was elected with 9,797 votes out of 19,939 total valid votes cast. This was equivalent to 49.1% of total valid votes cast. He was elected over Yakubu Stephen of the New Patriotic Party, Barichie Tilata Yakubu of the Convention People's Party and Aboyella Charles an independent candidate. These obtained 6,216, 199 and 3727 votes respectively of total votes cast. These were equivalent to 31.2%, 1.0%  and 18.7% respectively of total valid votes cast.

Personal life 
Awuni is a Christian.

See also 
 List of MPs elected in the 2004 Ghanaian parliamentary election

References 

Living people
1940 births
Ghanaian MPs 2005–2009
National Democratic Congress (Ghana) politicians